Capsicum baccatum is a member of the genus Capsicum, and is one of the five domesticated chili pepper species. The fruit tends to be very pungent, and registers 30,000 to 50,000 on the Scoville Heat Unit scale.

Chili pepper varieties in the C. baccatum species have white or cream colored flowers, and typically have a green or gold corolla. The flowers are either insect or self-pollinated. The fruit pods of the baccatum species have been cultivated into a wide variety of shapes and sizes, unlike other capsicum species, which tend to have a characteristic shape. The pods typically hang down, unlike a Capsicum frutescens plant, and can have a citrus or fruity flavor.

The C. baccatum species, particularly the Ají amarillo chili, has its origins in ancient Peru and across the Andean region of South America. It is typically associated with Peruvian cuisine, and is considered part of its condiment trinity together with red onion and coriander. Ají amarillo literally means yellow chili; however, the yellow color appears when cooked, as the mature pods are bright orange.

Yellow ají is one of the ingredients of Peruvian cuisine and Bolivian cuisine. It is used as a condiment, especially in many dishes and sauces. In Peru the chilis are mostly used fresh, and in Bolivia dried and ground. Common dishes with ají "amarillo" are the Peruvian stew Ají de gallina ("Hen Chili"), Papa a la Huancaína and the Bolivian Fricasé Paceño, among others. In Ecuadorian cuisine, Ají amarillo, onion, and lemon juice (amongst others) are served in a separate bowl with many meals as an optional additive. In Colombian cuisine, Peruvian Cuisine, and Ecuadorian cuisine, ají (sauce) is also a common condiment.

Cultivated baccatum (C. baccatum var. pendulum) is the domesticated pepper of choice of Bolivia, Colombia, Ecuador, Peru and Chile. The Moche culture often represented fruits and vegetables in their art, including Ají amarillo peppers. South American farmers also grow C. baccatum as ornamental plants for export.

Etymology 
Some form of the word ají has been used since approximately 4600 BCE. It was first used in the protolanguage Otomanguean. It then spread along with the Capsicum fruit from Central and South America to other pepper growing regions. Capsicum baccatum is still referred to as ají, while other peppers are referred to as pepper via the Spanish conquistadors noting of the similarity in heat sensation to Piper sp.

Its Latin binomial is made up of Capsicum from the Greek kapos, and baccatum meaning berry-like.

Cultivars
This species of chili pepper includes the following cultivars:

Ají amarillo, also called amarillo chili and ají escabeche
Bishop's crown
Lemon drop, ají limón or ají limo
Piquanté Pepper

See also

List of Capsicum cultivars

References

External links
 Eshbaugh, W. Hardy. Peppers: History and Exploitation of a Serendipitous New Crop Discovery (1993)
 

baccatum
Flora of Peru
Peruvian cuisine
Bolivian cuisine
Chili peppers